Ravichandran is an Indian name. Notable people with the name include:

 Ravichandran (Tamil actor) (1942–2011)
 Ravichandran (Tamil film director) (born 1971)
 N. Ravichandran (professor) (1955), professor at IIM Ahmedabad
 N. Ravichandran, Indian business magnate
 Ravichandran Ashwin (born 1986), Indian cricketer
 Ravichandran (Kannada actor) (born 1961), film actor, director and producer
 Viswanathan Ravichandran (active since 1997), Tamil film producer
 Govindasamy Ravichandran, Indian fisherman and former participant of a murder case in Singapore

References 

Indian masculine given names
Surnames of Indian origin